Jonathan Christie (born 9 July 1983, in Glasgow) is a field hockey player from Scotland, playing as a forward. He represented Scotland at the 2006 Commonwealth Games and played in the Euro Hockey League 2007-08 for Kelburne HC. His
younger brother Michael is a member of Scotland's men's team.

References

1983 births
Living people
Scottish male field hockey players
Field hockey players at the 2006 Commonwealth Games
Field hockey players from Glasgow
Commonwealth Games competitors for Scotland